Alan Bruce Slifka (October 13, 1929 – February 4, 2011) was a New York investor and philanthropist, a co-founder of the Abraham Fund and founding chairman of the Big Apple Circus. He was a native of Manhattan.

Education
Slifka and his sister were initially home schooled by their mother. This provided an opportunity for the twins to learn the importance of moral values and the basics of coexistence. In the fourth grade, the twins began studying at the Ethical Culture Society's Fieldston School.

Slifka graduated from Yale University in 1951, where he worked on the business staff of campus humor magazine the Yale Record. He then went on to earn a Master's degree in Business Administration at Harvard University in 1953.

Professional background
Following his graduation from Harvard, Slifka joined the financial firm L.F. Rothschild & Company, where he worked as a securities analyst for 32 years, rising to partner before leaving to start his own company, now Halcyon Asset Management.

Philanthropy
In 1977, Slifka became the founding chairman of the New York School for Circus Arts, a non-profit training school whose performing arm is the Big Apple Circus. In 1993, he became founding chairman emeritus. In 1995, in recognition of Slifka's lead gift to a successful capital campaign, the circus's new permanent creative center in Walden, NY was named the Slifka Family Creative Center.

Together with sociologist Eugene Wiener, Slifka was a co-founder in 1989 of The Abraham Fund Initiatives, named for the common ancestor of Arabs and Jews, and served as chairman of the organization since its founding. This was the first nonprofit organization dedicated to furthering coexistence between Israel's Arab and Jewish citizens. The Abraham Fund works to advance a shared society of inclusion and equality between Jews and Arabs in Israel.

The Slifka Program on Intercommunal Coexistence at Brandeis University, create by Slifka in 2001, seeks to build professional expertise and creative leadership in the field of coexistence and offers a master's degree in coexistence and conflict. The Sylvia and Joseph Slifka Israeli Coexistence Scholarship at Brandeis, which Slifka funded in honor of his parents, is awarded each year to two citizens of Israel (one Jewish, one Arab) who are committed to fostering coexistence and harmony.

In recognition of his work with The Abraham Fund Initiatives, Slifka was awarded the Knesset Prize for Coexistence in 2000. Brandeis awarded him an honorary doctorate in 2003.

Alan B. Slifka Foundation
The Alan B. Slifka Foundation was established in New York in 1965. The foundation's goals include harmony not only among Jews and Arabs but also between religious and secular elements of Israeli society. In addition to fostering Jewish values and education, the foundation also promotes biomedical research on sarcomas and autism spectrum disorders.

Personal life
Alan Bruce Slifka was the son of Joseph and Sylvia Slifka. His twin sister is Barbara Slifka. His father owned successful textile and real estate businesses.

At the time of his death he was married to Riva Ritvo-Slifka. He had three sons, Michael, Randolph, and David.

References

1929 births
2011 deaths
American bankers
Jewish American philanthropists
Philanthropists from New York (state)
Autism activists
Harvard Business School alumni
People from Manhattan
Yale University alumni
20th-century American philanthropists
21st-century American Jews